Limerick Museum and Archives (LM&A) was a partnership between two separate and distinct institutions, the Limerick City Museum and the Limerick Archives, which existed from 2013 and 2017. Both are funded by Limerick City and County Council. 

The two institutions worked in collaboration with other public and private institutions on a number of projects, exhibitions and publications relating to the history of Limerick city and county. 

In May 2017, with the move of Limerick Museum to the old Franciscan Friary in Henry Street, the partnership was ended and the two institutions reverted to working separately.

Exhibitions

2013 St. Joseph's Hospital Exhibition 
2014 Retrospective, Limerick City and Limerick County Council 
2014 Haselbeck Collection  
2014 From Limerick with Love  with Limerick Leader, Shannon Airport, Limerick School of Art and Design
2014 Limerick Lace  with interactive elements from University of Limerick
2015 Stand Up and Fight

References

Museums in County Limerick